Grandmother is a 1922 Czech drama film directed by Thea Červenková.

Cast
 Ludmila Innemannová as Grandmother
 Anna Vaicová-Brabcová as Viktorka
 Růžena Maturová as Viktorka's mother
 Vojtěch Záhořík as Viktorka's father/Gamekeeper Beyer
 Liduška Innemannová as Barunka Prošková
 Josef Vraný as Gamekeeper
 Jiřina Janderová as Countess Kateřina Vilemína Zaháňská
 František Smolík as Emperor Josef II.
 Milada Smolíková as Grandmother (young)
 Arnošta Záhoříková as Beyer's wife
 Anči Jelínková as Kristla

References

External links
 

1922 films
1920s Czech-language films
Czech drama films
1922 drama films
Czech silent films
Czechoslovak black-and-white films
Silent drama films